Xiaomi Redmi Note 5 is a smartphone developed by Xiaomi Inc. It is a part of Xiaomi's budget Redmi Note smartphone line. Redmi Note 5 was announced on 14 February 2018 in Delhi, India, alongside the local release of the Redmi Note 5 Pro.

On 1 March, Xiaomi announced the Chinese release of Redmi Note 5 with only a 13 MP front camera instead of 20 MP. Redmi note 5 and Redmi note 5 pro will be near End of life still running on Android 9 while it supports treble.

Specifications

Hardware 
The Redmi Note 5 runs on Snapdragon 625 processor. It is a 64-bit architecture-based chipset that has 8x Qualcomm® A53 CPUs with a clock speed up to 2.0 GHz that supports Qualcomm® Adreno™ 506 GPU. This chipset is able to render FHD+ (18:9) display screen.
It comes with a 5.99" full HD+ display, that has an 18:9 aspect ratio, the screen on the Redmi Note 5 has a screen-to-body ratio of 77%. The screen on the device comes with multi-touch support and uses a 2.5 curved glass screen for ultra clarity. The Redmi Note 5 has a ppt rating of 403 and a maximum resolution of 1080x2160, the LCD IPS screen allows for smooth & accurate scrolling.

The main dual-camera setup at the rear of the Redmi Note 5 is located, unlike its predecessors, at the top-left corner on a protruding camera bump that resembles the one present on the iPhone X. It is composed by a 12 MP image sensor plus a 5 MP depth sensor used in portrait mode to have a bokeh effect in pictures. The 13-megapixel front-facing camera features a front flashlight rated for 4500K color temperatures as claimed by the company.

Redmi Note 5 comes with 3GB or 4GB RAM and 32GB or 64GB expandable storage memory.

Software 
Redmi Note 5 (China) runs on MIUI 10 based on Android 8.1 Oreo.
Redmi Note 5 Pro (India) and Redmi Note 5 (Global) runs on MIUI 11 based on Android 9 Pie Chinese version also was updated to MIUI 12.

Features
The most important thing is that the mobile is secure. smartphones come with a fingerprint reader and other sensors including an accelerometer, gyro, proximity, and compass. Additionally, include a radio. A lot of people like the audio quality, which is Noise -29.7 dB / Crosstalk -91.8 dB. It's helpful because it's not quite sharp.

Reception 
Redmi Note 5 received mostly positive reviews. TechRadar called it the best budget smartphone in the market and rated it 4/5. However lack of NFC and USB type C port, as well as the camera bump and inclusion of advertisements in the UI has been criticized.

Colors 
Redmi Note 5 was available in 5 colors:

 Lake Blue  
 Rose Gold  
 Gold  
 Black   
 Red

The most popular color is Lake Blue, which was an instant hit among the users. Red is the next best; it was introduced at a later date.

Sales 
On 22 February 2018, in the first sale of the phone, the Indian division of Xiaomi claimed to had sold more than 300,000 Redmi Note 5 (Redmi 5 Plus) and Redmi Note 5 Pro units in less than three minutes and called it the biggest sale in the Indian history of smartphones.

References

External links
 Official Redmi Note 5 website

Redmi smartphones
Mobile phones introduced in 2018
Mobile phones with multiple rear cameras
Mobile phones with infrared transmitter
Discontinued smartphones